Johan Eric Dennelind (born 1969) is a Swedish businessman, and a former CEO of du, a United Arab Emirates telecom company, from September 2019 to September 2020. He was previously president and CEO of Telia Company, the dominant telephone company and mobile network operator in Sweden and Finland .

Early life
Dennelind was born in 1969. He has a master's degree in Business Administration from the Örebro University, Sweden.

Career
Dennelind started with Telia Company as a management trainee in 1990.

He was the CEO of Teliasonera from 2013 to 2016. He was then president and CEO of Telia Company, the dominant telephone company and mobile network operator in Sweden and Finland until 2019.

In September 2019, he succeeded Osman Sultan as CEO of du, a United Arab Emirates telecom company, and departed the company a year later.

Personal life
Dennelind is married, with children.

References

1969 births
Swedish corporate directors
Swedish business executives
20th-century Swedish businesspeople
21st-century Swedish businesspeople
Living people
Swedish chief executives
Örebro University alumni